Supriya Paul (born 16 September 1993) is an Indian entrepreneur, the co-founder and CEO of Josh Talks. She has written a book, All You Need Is Josh: Stories of Courage and Conviction in 21st-century India.

Early life and education
Paul studied at Sri Venkateswara College. She studied Hindustani classical music for 13 years.

Career
Paul along with Shobhit Banga co-founded Josh Talks in January 2015. She has written a book, All You Need Is Josh: Stories of Courage and Conviction in 21st-century India.

Books
All You Need Is Josh: Stories of Courage and Conviction in 21st-century India

Awards
Asia 30 Under 30 list for 2018.
SheThePeople Digital Women Award’17 for Best Content Creation

References

Living people
Indian company founders
1993 births